Mecistophylla amechanica is a species of snout moth in the genus Mecistophylla. It was described by Turner in 1942 in Queensland, Australia.

References

Moths described in 1942
Tirathabini